Philip J. Reny is the Hugo F. Sonnenschein Distinguished Service Professor in Economics and in the college at the University of Chicago. Reny is known as an economic theorist and perhaps is best known for the textbook Advanced microeconomic theory written jointly with Geoffrey A. Jehle. He is a member of The American Academy of Arts and Sciences (since 2015), and was the Head Editor of Journal of Political Economy.  In 1996, Reny became a fellow of the Econometric Society.  He has also been a charter member of the Game Theory Society since 1999, and a fellow of the Society for the Advancement of Economic Theory starting in 2012.

Selected publications
 Jehle, G. A., & Reny, P. J. (2001). Advanced microeconomic theory. Boston: Addison-Wesley. 
 Reny, Philip J. (1992) "Rationality in extensive-form games." The Journal of Economic Perspectives  103–118.
 Reny, Philip J. (1999) "On the existence of pure and mixed strategy Nash equilibria in discontinuous games." Econometrica 67.5 1029–1056.

References

External links 
 University of Chicago: Philip J. Reny's homepage

21st-century American economists
University of Chicago faculty
1958 births
Living people
Fellows of the Econometric Society
Fellows of the American Academy of Arts and Sciences
Journal of Political Economy editors